Peter Adamson may refer to:

 Peter Adamson (actor) (1930–2002), British stage and television actor best known for playing the character of Len Fairclough in Coronation Street
 Peter Adamson (politician) (born 1961), Australian politician
 Peter Adamson (academic) (born 1972), American professor of philosophy

See also 
 Adamson (surname)